Acrocercops bifrenis is a moth of the family Gracillariidae, known from Maharashtra and Karnataka, India.

The hostplant for the species is Calycopteris floribunda. They mine the leaves of their host plant. The mine consists of a rather long blotch under the upper cuticle of the leaf.

References

bifrenis
Moths of Asia
Moths described in 1918